The Guardian Cycle is a series of five adult contemporary fantasy novels by Julia Gray.

Novels
The Dark Moon (2001)
The Jasper Forest (2001)
The Crystal Desert (2002)
The Red Glacier (2003)
Alyssa's Ring (2003)

Setting
The setting for the books is the fictional planet of Nydus, with the adventure starting in Vadanis of the Empire of the Floating Islands, a realm dominated by astrology and other means of prophetic divination, to the extent that people are confined as insane for picking potatoes at an unpropitious time. An uncertainty and growing apprehension about the inability to translate the heaven's signs makes the people increasingly fearful and restless.

The world of Nydus' most distinctive and influential feature is its four moons—the White Moon, the Red Moon, the Amber Moon, and the Dark Moon. These heavenly bodies' phases and pulls govern the lives of all Nydus' people, particularly the lives of those living in the Floating Islands. Strange happenstances in recent times, mysterious and ancient prophecies, and magic constantly misused are also themes across the world and through all five books.

Plot summaries

The Dark Moon
Adina, wife of the ailing Emperor Dheran, gives birth during an eclipse, at exactly the point in time predicted in the Tindaya Code—the ancient, ambiguous and oft-mistranslated prophecy written on the ruins of the temple at the mountain of Tindaya—thus her child is proclaimed to be the saviour of the world: the Guardian. However, Adina gives birth to twins, one an exuberant, healthy boy named Jax, but the other an undersized and crippled boy who would come to be called Terrel. With the Seers who run Vadanis in uproar about the unpredicted arrival of twins, and disgusted with his condition, Terrel is sent to, and brought up in, Haven—an asylum for the insane, utterly unaware of his royal lineage.

There Terrel grows up with his friends Elam—a young boy put in Haven for picking a potato at the wrong time—and Alyssa, a pretty and strange young girl. Terrel is bitter about his and his friends' incarceration, but knows nothing of his origin, until one day when the trio explore outside Haven in the ruins of an observatory and discover the journal of a hermit named Muzeni. Soon after a Seer, Shahan, arrives at Haven enquiring about Terrel. These increasingly bizarre events are followed by Shahan's death, and then, much to Terrel's distress, Elam's death. When Alyssa is almost raped by a soldier she descends into a magically protected comatose state, and Terrel leaves Haven to find answers.

Discovering he is connected to the Tindaya Code, realizing his own magical powers of a healer, and speculating whether he is the Guardian or the Mentor (the role of the one, or many, who will guide or help the Guardian fulfill his world-saving prophecy) along the way, Terrel is visited by Alyssa in the form of animals that speak to him in his mind. He also is contacted and helped by three ghosts—the spirits of Muzeni, Shahan, and Elam. On top of this, his efforts to do as he is guided and follow through with the Tindaya Code, Terrel is visited in his dreams by Jax (whose basic powers involve manipulating people through dreams), whom he does not know is his brother, and tormented by him. It is during this that many mysterious deaths and answers are revealed. Terrel has many experiences regarding the current panicked state of the Empire before arriving at the apparent source and confronting an elemental being, an Ancient, that seems to be connected to all the other recent strange phenomena and the maligning of the moons.

Terrel helps the Ancient and discovers the truth about his birth, but Jax betrays him out of spite, and despite Terrel saving Vadanis  he is exiled, put on a raft in the wake of the floating islands to die in the unforgiving ocean.

The Jasper Forest
Terrel instead survives and arrives on the non-Floating, stable "barbarian land" of Macul. Here he is taken in by a family who live under a terrible oppression in the shadow of a mountain. Terrel comes to integrate himself with these people by winning their trust through his healing, and soon becomes embroiled in their politics and way of life. However, Alyssa and the ghosts come to tell Terrel that his mission in the Tindaya Code is far from over.

Terrel learns of the existence of other "Sleepers" like Alyssa and learns of a rock-like creature being used by Macul's king as a way to kill prisoners for entertainment.  Terrel embarks on a journey to the capital city of Talazoria in order to speak with the Elemental and, hopefully, avoid a catastrophe that could affect the entire planet.

On the way, Terrel meets strange new people (including a group that live in a valley blanketed by cloud such that they never see the sky) and develops his ability as a healer, as well as discovering how to learn languages quickly through the use of psinoma.  Alyssa and the ghosts continue to guide him as he attempts to maintain the bargain he made with the first Ancient on Vadanis.

When Terrel's task on Macul is finished, he learns that he must journey onward and further from home.

The Crystal Desert
Two oceans away from his homeland of Vadanis, Terrel finds himself in the harsh desert land of Misrah.  There he is accepted by a nomadic tribe called the Toma, but soon learns that not all is well in this country - the Kullana river (the main source of water) has completely dried up and a shortage of water supplies across the region is leading to honourless and brutal warfare among an increasing number of the tribes.  To make matters worse, a large number of desperately hungry groups of refugees from the northern lands are moving south through the desert in an increasingly hopeless bid to reach the sea.  Also, a sickness is going around the land which makes its sufferers refuse to drink water.

Terrel realizes that another elemental which lives in the mountain of Makranash in the middle of a vast forbidding desert is somehow the cause of this, and joins the Toma's team in an annual race between the desert's tribes to this sacred mountain.  Once there, he petitions the elemental to undo the evil that it has done.

The Red Glacier
Now Terrel finds himself in the war-torn land of Myvatan, where war has reigned for three hundred and forty years, since the last great conclave, and only a few wizards know what started it. And now Tofana, the greatest wizard of the black quarter, wants to control a power that he holds the key to as well. The most brutal of the forces of nature are going to be used to fight this ever escalating battle...

But his task though has nothing to do with the inhabitants, but to do with the elemental in the heart of the mountain at the lonely peaks, surrounded by a glacier of epic proportions. The journey will be difficult but that is nothing compared to the healing that awaits him at the end.

Alyssa's Ring
The conclusion. Terrel has returned to the Island of his birth, Vadanis. But it is not over yet, first he must overcome those that have sought to destroy him. And for the prophecy to be fulfilled the Ancients must arise, and Terrel must defend them. And as the dark moon rises, Terrel makes his stand - but this time he does not fight alone...

Other books by Julia Gray

Julia Gray is a pseudonym of Mark and Julia Smith, who also write as Jonathan Wylie.

 Ice Mage - Orbit Books 1998
 Fire music - Orbit Books 1999
 Isle of the Dead - Orbit Books 1999

External links
 Orbit Books
 
 Review of Ice Mage on Infinity Plus
 Julia Gray at fantastic fiction
 Jonathan Wylie on Infinity Plus
 Interview with the author

Fantasy novel series